Norton is an unincorporated community in Delaware County, in the U.S. state of Ohio.

History
Norton was laid out before 1810 by Colonel James Kilbourne. A post office called Norton was established in 1816, and remained in operation until 1912.

References

Unincorporated communities in Delaware County, Ohio
Unincorporated communities in Ohio